The Indiana University Archives of African American Music and Culture (AAAMC), established in 1991, is a material repository covering a range of African American musical idioms and cultural expressions from the post-World War II era. The collections highlight popular, religious, and classical music, with genres ranging from blues and gospel to R&B and contemporary hip hop. The AAAMC also houses extensive materials related to the documentation of Black radio.

The purpose of the Archives of African American Music and Culture is to establish a
unique primary and secondary source material collection of African-American music and
culture where such materials are scarce or nonexistent, and to preserve and disseminate these materials
for research and instructional purposes. In doing so, its mission is to provide these materials to the general public through outreach
programs such as live performances, exhibitions, seminars, workshops, and summer music
camps and to engage in collaborative research and creative projects with units at Indiana University as
well as with state and national institutions and associations. In addition, AAAMC develops instructional multi-media
materials such as websites, CD-ROM programs, and video documentaries related to various
aspects of African American music and provides practical experience in archiving and 
preparation of materials for public use.

The AAAMC supports the research of scholars, students, and the general public worldwide by providing access to holdings which include oral histories, photographs, musical and print manuscripts, audio and video recordings, educational broadcast programs, and the personal papers of individuals and organizations concerned with Black music. The repository also encourages exploration of its collections and related topics through a variety of public events, print and online publications, and pedagogical resources.

Directors

Radio Repository

Black-appeal stations
Donated material
Disc Jockeys 
Black Radio: Telling It Like It Was
Ed Castleberry Collection
Jocko Henderson Collection
Jack Gibson collection
Portia K. Maultsby Collection 
Skipper Lee Frazier Collection

Genres

Special Collections
General Collections
Black Radio
Classical
Hip Hop
Music Industry
Popular Music
Religious Music
Online Access
Digital Exhibits

Publications

Liner Notes
Liner Notes is AAAMC's annual newsletter. Issues are available online at Liner Notes

Black Grooves
Black Grooves is a monthly music review site hosted by the Archives of African American Music and Culture. Issues are available online at Black Grooves

See also

List of Oral History Repositories
List of open-air and living history museums in the United States
List of ethnomusicology archives in the US 
List of Archives of African American History by State

References

Further reading
Black Radio in Los Angeles, Chicago & New York A Bibliography, Dr George Hill APR & JJ Johnson with foreword by Jack Gibson

1991 establishments in Indiana
Museums established in 1991
African-American museums in Indiana
African-American arts organizations
African-American culture
Black studies organizations
Bloomington, Indiana
Photo archives in the United States
Special collections libraries in the United States
Arts organizations based in Indiana